The Special Malaysia Disaster Assistance and Rescue Team (Jawi: ڤاسوكن منچاري دان مڽلامت خاص مليسيا) or internationally known as SMART, is a disaster relief and rescue task force established under the National Security Council based on the approval of the Cabinet on 18 May 1994. The SMART task force is a United Nations INSARAG certified Heavy USAR (Urban Search and Rescue team) in June 2016.

The team draws its members from the Malaysian Armed Forces, Royal Malaysian Police and Fire and Rescue Department of Malaysia.

History 

Malaysia has been through three major disasters since 1988 which is Sultan Abdul Halim ferry terminal bridge collapse in the year 1988, Bright Sparklers Fireworks disaster in 1991 and Klang Port Chong Hong 3 Tanker Explosion in 1992. The pinnacle of disaster in Malaysia happens in the year 1993 when the Highland Towers collapse in Ulu Klang, outskirt of Kuala Lumpur. The tragedy came to world attention in which five countries sent aid workers to help. They are from the USA, Great Britain, Détachement d'intervention catastrophes aéromobile (DICA) from France, Japan Disaster Relief Team (JDRT) from Japan and Disaster Assistance and Rescue Team (DART) from Singapore. The JDRT lead by Kiyoshi Shidara then donates their sophisticated equipment to Malaysia.

Following the collapse of the Highland Towers tragedy on 11 December 1993, Malaysia intends to establish a disaster rescue team based on the Japanese JDRT. The Cabinet Committee then convened on 18 May 1994 approved the establishment of the SMART team under the management of the National Security Council. The SMART will draw its members from three government departments which are Fire and Rescue Department of Malaysia (FRDM), Royal Malaysian Police (RMP) and the Malaysian Armed Forces (MAF).

On 1 August 1996, the SMART finally established with a strength of 85 personnel including officers. SMART is put under the National Security Council.

On 1 January 2004, SMART is expanded to 104 personnel.

On 1 June 2009, SMART moving to new SMART Headquarter in Pulau Meranti, Puchong.

On 1 June 2014, SMART is expanding again to 141 personnel and their salary grade was standardised.

In May 2015, SMART planning to apply for INSARAG certification.

On 5 June 2016, SMART gets INSARAG certification. With this certification, SMART is the second Disaster Relief team to be certified in Southeast Asia after the Singaporean Disaster Assistance and Rescue Team.

On 11 April 2019, the SMART was chosen to become a mentor to the Brunei rescue team. SMART will assist the team until they get their INSARAG certification.

Functions 
Under National Security Council Directive No.19 and Directive No.20, there are four main functions of SMART outlined by the Malaysian Government:
 Act to perform search and rescue duties which the task is beyond the capabilities of existing rescue agencies.
 Conduct search and rescue operations which require high expertise and sophisticated equipment.
 Responsible in the event which is expected to be a major disaster and involving many victims.
 Act to help in overseas disasters when directed to do so by the Prime Minister.

Identity 
Dark Blue Beret

All SMART members wear a navy blue beret.

Red Helmet

SMART team wear the same red helmet worn by FRDM Special Forces.

Blue Uniform

All SMART members wear a blue uniform to differentiate them from other rescue teams.

Logo

Four white water drop shapes
Symbolises the four roles of SMART which are:
 Search
 Rescue
 Assist rescue efforts
 Provide rescue assistance overseas

Four yellow coloured sharp shapes
Represent four types of disastrous threats:
 Land
 Sea
 Air
 Disaster at overseas

Four red coloured round shape
Symbolises the four key capabilities of SMART:
 Moving fast
 Always ready
 Move within 24 hours to help either local or overseas
 Special expertise in technical assistance

Center of the target shape
Symbolising always in a state ready to be moved within 24 hours notice.

Upward pointing arrow shape
Symbolises the power or effort toward the success of the rescue or describe the hardships to produce something of a pleasure.

Hand with thumb up shape
Symbolises the process of handling or lifting something out. Used to reveal:
 Help
 Ability
 Efficiency
 Success
 Good deed
 Brilliance
 Power/skills

Yellow, red, white and blue colours
Colours on the flag of Malaysia

Selections and training 

SMART only opens its membership to personnel from the Fire and Rescue Department of Malaysia, Royal Malaysian Police and Malaysian Army.

SMART always train together with other government agency and department. They even conduct training for private sectors and educational institutions. SMART enjoys good relations with the Singaporean Disaster Assistance and Rescue Team (DART) and they always train together.

At the original department 
The application for the SMART can only be applied by personnel from the Fire and Rescue Department of Malaysia, Royal Malaysia Police and Malaysian Army from their respective bases/HQ. 
 Priority shall be given to candidates who are really interested from respectively department or agency's announcement.
 Physically and mentally healthy, and passed a medical examination from the government or military hospital.
 Have a good track record and is certified free of disciplinary action.

SMART Stage 
All selected candidates into the SMART Stage will be a test based on:

Individual Physical Proficiency Test (IPPT)

Phobia of height test

 platform diving,  swimming freestyle and five minutes float conducted at PULAPOL, Semarak Street, Kuala Lumpur.

Phobia of blood and corpses test

The test will be assessed by the Kuala Lumpur Hospital Forensic Unit.

Phobia of dark and confined space test

The test session will be done in 'Smoke Gallery at Fire and Rescue Academy of Malaysia (FRAM), Kuala Kubu Bharu, Selangor.Final interview'

Candidates will be interviewed by the board of interviewer consist of T/SUM, BPB, BKP and Commander of SMART.

Basic Course

SMART Special Course (11 Weeks) 

This arduous course lasts for 11 weeks. In this course, trainees will be trained hard at any time. Among the module that's been taught during the course is; Medical, Urban search and rescue (USAR), Road Traffic Accident (RTA), High Angle & Rope rescue, HAZMAT and many more. Also, the trainees are required to undergo physical training every day as well as individual and team tests such as obstacle courses and endurance circuit. IPPT is also conducted every Friday throughout the course and the final test; trainers will be tested with  casualty evacuation through hilly terrain around Kuala Kubu Bharu.

Bronze Medallion Rescue Course (3 Weeks) 
This is a three-week military style water rescue course organised by SMART in cooperation with the Life Saving Society Malaysia. This course is a must for the SMART and Malaysian Lifeguard members.

In the final examination, trainees need to pass a few tests in order to get the Bronze Medallion Certificate:
 swimming and  Chin-tow circuit.
 swimming and  Rope-towing circuit.
 rope throwing.
 fully clothes Cross-chest towing.
 Combine rescue.

International Life Saver Certificate 
International Life Saver (ILS) is an international certificate for water rescue. Bronze Medallion Rescue Course trainee needs to take three more tests to get ILS certificate. The three tests are:
 swimming under 1 minute and 40 seconds.
 swimming under 9 minutes.
 diving underwater under one breath.

First Responder Life Support (FRLS) Course 
FRLS Course is a two-level paramedic management course and usually organised at Malaysian Civil Defense Force Academy (ALPHA).

At level 1, trainees will learn basic paramedic techniques and skills. At level 2, trainees will learn how to differentiate trauma patients from other patients and how to treat them.

Advance Course 

 CBRN
 Abseiling / Rappelling
 Underwater Rescue
 Landslide, Tunnel and Trench Rescue
 Cave Rescue
 Net Rescue
 Cable Car Rescue
 Driving Technique Course

Missions 

The missions that SMART have participated in includes:
 1996: Search and Rescue operation for Genting Highland bus accidents, Pahang.
 1996: Search and Rescue mission for Greg Storm in Keningau, Sabah.
 1997: Rescue and firefighting mission for Indonesian forest fires in Sumatra and Kalimantan, Indonesia.
 1999: Search and Rescue operation for İzmit Earthquake disaster in Golchuk, Turkey.
 2001: Search and Rescue operation at Mount Kinabalu, Sabah.
 2001: Search and Rescue mission for Gujerat Earthquake disaster in Gujerat, India.
 2002: Search and Rescue mission for Simunjan landslide incident in Simunjan, Sarawak.
 2002: Search and Rescue mission for Taman Hillview landslide incident in June 2002 in Ulu Klang, Selangor. This incident happens near to Highland Tower.
 2003: Search and Rescue mission for The Curve building collapse in Mutiara Damansara, Petaling Jaya, Selangor.
 2004: Search and Rescue mission for Taman Harmoni landslide in Gombak, Selangor.
 2004: Search and Rescue mission for Indian Ocean earthquake and tsunami disaster in Acheh, Indonesia.
 2005: Search and Rescue operation for Nias–Simeulue earthquake disaster in Nias, Indonesia.
 2005: Search and Rescue mission for Kashmir earthquake disaster in Balakot, Pakistan.
 2005: Rescue and firefighting mission for Riau forest fire in Riau, Indonesia.
 2006: Search and Rescue mission for Kampung Pasir landslide in Ulu Klang, Selangor. This incident happens not too far from Highland Tower.
 2006: Search and Rescue operation for Southern Leyte mudslide disaster in Leyte, Philippines.
 2006: Search and Rescue operation for Yogyakarta earthquake disaster in Yogyakarta, Indonesia.
 2007: Rescue mission for Johor flood victims.
 2008: Search and Rescue mission for Ulu Yam landslide in Ulu Yam, Selangor.
 2008: Search and Rescue mission for Bukit Antarabangsa landslide incident in Ulu Klang, Selangor. This incident happens not far from Highland Tower.
 2009: Search and Rescue mission for cave collapse at Ipoh Cave Temples in Ipoh, Perak.
 2009: Search and Rescue operation for building collapse in Section 14, Petaling Jaya, Selangor.
 2009: Search and Rescue operation for Sumatra earthquakes disaster in Padang, Indonesia.
 2011: Search and Rescue operation for Tohoku earthquakes disaster in Japan.
 2013: Search and Rescue operation for Genting Highland bus accidents, Pahang.
 2013: Search and Rescue operation for Typhoon Haiyan disaster in Leyte, Philippines.
 2014: Search and Rescue operation for Malaysia Airlines Flight 17 incident in Donetsk Oblast, Ukraine.
 2015: Search and Rescue mission for Nepal earthquake disaster in Nepal.
 2015: Search and Rescue mission for Sabah earthquake disaster in Ranau, Sabah.
 2016: Search and Rescue operation for Taman Idaman landslide incident in Serendah, Selangor
 2016: Search and Rescue operation for KL Eco City flyover collapse in Bangsar, Kuala Lumpur.
2019: Cleaning Kim Kim River toxic pollution in Pasir Gudang, Johor.
2022: Search and rescue operation for the Batang Kali landslide in Batang Kali, Selangor (near Genting Highland, Pahang).
2023: Search and rescue operation for the Turkey–Syria earthquakes.

References 

Federal ministries, departments and agencies of Malaysia
Disaster management